Ohain is a Belgian village and district of the municipality of Lasne, Wallonia in the province of Walloon Brabant.

Gallery

External links

Sub-municipalities of Lasne
Former municipalities of Walloon Brabant